is a retired Japanese football player.

Career
Ayumu Nagato joined J2 League club Montedio Yamagata in 2016. After two seasons in J2 with Montedio, he joined on loan newly-relegated J3 team Thespakusatsu Gunma.

On 30 December 2019 Montedio Yamagata and 22-year old Nagato confirmed, that he had decided to retire.

Club statistics
Updated to end of 2018 season.

References

External links
Profile at Thespakusatsu Gunma

1997 births
Living people
Association football people from Chiba Prefecture
Japanese footballers
J2 League players
J3 League players
Japan Football League players
Montedio Yamagata players
Thespakusatsu Gunma players
FC Maruyasu Okazaki players
Association football forwards